Mihalıççık, also Mihalıçcık (English: Micalizo, sometimes Mihaliccik), is a town and district of Eskişehir Province in the Central Anatolia region of Turkey. According to 2010 census, population of the district is 10,482 of which 3,133 live in the town of Mihalıççık.

See also
 Gökçekaya Dam

Notes

References

External links
 District governor's official website 
 District municipality's official website 
 Map of Mihalıççık district

Towns in Turkey
Populated places in Eskişehir Province
Districts of Eskişehir Province